State Route 102 (SR 102) is a  east–west state highway in the western part of the U.S. state of Alabama. The eastern terminus of the highway is at an intersection with SR 124 in Townley in western Walker County.

Route description
SR 102 serves as a connecting route between Fayette and Jasper. From its western terminus, the highway travels across Fayette and Walker counties. It does not travel through any incorporated cities. It travels eastward along a road with numerous curves. The route reaches its eastern terminus in the unincorporated town of Townley, where it intersects SR 124, which heads to Jasper.

History

SR 102 was designated in 1962. It replaced Fayette County Route 47 (CR 47) and Walker CR 47.

Future

SR 102 will have an interchange with Interstate 22 (I-22) at exit 53.

Major intersections

See also

References

External links

102
Transportation in Fayette County, Alabama
Transportation in Walker County, Alabama